This is a list of electoral divisions and wards in the ceremonial county of West Midlands in the West Midlands. All changes since the re-organisation of local government following the passing of the Local Government Act 1972 are shown. The number of councillors elected for each electoral division or ward is shown in brackets.

District councils

Birmingham
Wards from 1 April 1974 (first election 10 May 1973) to 6 May 1982:

Wards from 6 May 1982 to 10 June 2004:

Wards from 10 June 2004 to 2018:

Wards from May 2018

Coventry
Wards from 1 April 1974 (first election 10 May 1973) to 1 May 1980:

Wards from 1 May 1980 to 10 June 2004:

Wards from 10 June 2004 to present:

Dudley
Wards from 1 April 1974 (first election 10 May 1973) to 6 May 1982:

Wards from 6 May 1982 to 10 June 2004:

Wards from 10 June 2004 to present:

Sandwell
Wards from 1 April 1974 (first election 10 May 1973) to 3 May 1979:

Wards from 3 May 1979 to 10 June 2004:

Wards from 10 June 2004 to present:

Solihull
Wards from 1 April 1974 (first election 10 May 1973) to 3 May 1979:

Wards from 3 May 1979 to 10 June 2004:

Wards from 10 June 2004 to present:

Walsall
Wards from 1 April 1974 (first election 10 May 1973) to 1 May 1980:

Wards from 1 May 1980 to 10 June 2004:

Wards from 10 June 2004 to present:

Wolverhampton
Wards from 1 April 1974 (first election 10 May 1973) to 6 May 1982:

Wards from 6 May 1982 to 10 June 2004:

Wards from 10 June 2004 to present:

Former county council

West Midlands
Electoral Divisions from 1 April 1974 (first election 12 April 1973) to 1 April 1986 (county abolished):

Electoral Divisions due from 2 May 1985 (order revoked by the Local Government Act 1985):

Electoral wards by constituency

Aldridge-Brownhills
Aldridge Central and South, Aldridge North and Walsall Wood, Brownhills, Pelsall, Rushall-Shelfield, Streetly.

Birmingham, Edgbaston
Bartley Green, Edgbaston, Harborne, Quinton.

Birmingham, Erdington
Erdington, Kingstanding, Stockland Green, Tyburn.

Birmingham, Hall Green
Hall Green, Moseley and Kings Heath, Sparkbrook, Springfield.

Birmingham, Hodge Hill
Bordesley Green, Hodge Hill, Shard End, Washwood Heath.

Birmingham, Ladywood
Aston, Ladywood, Nechells, Soho.

Birmingham, Northfield
Kings Norton, Longbridge, Northfield, Weoley.

Birmingham, Perry Barr
Handsworth Wood, Lozells and East Handsworth, Oscott, Perry Barr.

Birmingham, Selly Oak
Billesley, Bournville, Brandwood, Selly Oak.

Birmingham, Yardley
Acocks Green, Sheldon, South Yardley, Stechford and Yardley North.

Coventry North East
Foleshill, Henley, Longford, Lower Stoke, Upper Stoke, Wyken.

Coventry North West
Bablake, Holbrook, Radford, Sherbourne, Whoberley, Woodlands.

Coventry South
Binley and Willenhall, Cheylesmore, Earlsdon, St Michael's, Wainbody, Westwood.

Dudley North
Castle and Priory, Gornal, St James's, St Thomas's, Sedgley, Upper Gornal and Woodsetton.

Dudley South
Brierley Hill, Brockmoor and Pensnett, Kingswinford North and Wall Heath, Kingswinford South, Netherton, Woodside and St Andrews, Wordsley.

Halesowen and Rowley Regis
Belle Vale, Blackheath, Cradley Heath and Old Hill, Halesowen North, Halesowen South, Hayley Green and Cradley South, Rowley.

Meriden
Bickenhill, Blythe, Castle Bromwich, Chelmsley Wood, Dorridge and Hockley Heath, Kingshurst and Fordbridge, Knowle, Meriden, Smith's Wood.

Solihull
Elmdon, Lyndon, Olton, St Alphege, Shirley East, Shirley South, Shirley West, Silhill.

Stourbridge
Amblecote, Cradley and Foxcote, Lye and Wollescote, Norton, Pedmore and Stourbridge East, Quarry Bank and Dudley Wood, Wollaston and Stourbridge Town.

Sutton Coldfield
Sutton Four Oaks, Sutton New Hall, Sutton Trinity, Sutton Vesey.

Walsall North
Birchills Leamore, Blakenall, Bloxwich East, Bloxwich West, Short Heath, Willenhall North, Willenhall South.

Walsall South
Bentley and Darlaston North, Darlaston South, Paddock, Palfrey, Pheasey Park Farm, Pleck, St Matthew's.

Warley
Abbey, Bristnall, Langley, Old Warley, St Pauls, Smethwick, Soho and Victoria.

West Bromwich East
Charlemont with Grove Vale, Friar Park, Great Barr with Yew Tree, Greets Green and Lyng, Hateley Heath, Newton, West Bromwich Central.

West Bromwich West
Great Bridge, Oldbury, Princes End, Tipton Green, Tividale, Wednesbury North, Wednesbury South.

Wolverhampton North East
Bushbury North, Bushbury South and Low Hill, Fallings Park, Heath Town, Oxley, Wednesfield North, Wednesfield South.

Wolverhampton South East
Bilston East, Bilston North, Blakenhall, Coseley East, East Park, Ettingshall, Spring Vale.

Wolverhampton South West
Graiseley, Merry Hill, Park, Penn, St Peter's, Tettenhall Regis, Tettenhall Wightwick.

See also
List of parliamentary constituencies in the West Midlands (county)

References
http://www.opsi.gov.uk/si/si2007/uksi_20071681_en_1

West Midlands
 
Electoral wards